Cercospora lentis is a fungal plant pathogen.

References

lentis
Fungal plant pathogens and diseases